Christopher Thorn(e) or Chris Thorn(e) may refer to:

Christopher Thorn (musician) in Blind Melon
Christopher Thorne, historian
Christopher Thorne, Creative Commons board member
Chris Thorne (actor) in Shake Hands with the Devil (2007 film)
Chris Thorn in Minnesota Vikings draft history
Chris Thorne, character in Nothing but Trouble (1991 film)